MNH Entertainment (Korean: 엠앤에이치엔터테인먼트) is a privately held multinational entertainment group and talent agency based in Seoul. Founded in November 2014 by Lee Ju-seop, a former manager at JYP Entertainment. The company was founded on 18 November 2014 and manages artist such as former I.O.I member and soloist Chungha. MNH also introduced their first girl group BVNDIT in 2019. Their first actor Yoon Jae-yong was introduced in 2020, but he left in the same year.

History
The company was formed on November 18, 2014.

In 2016, trainee Kim Chung-ha was sent to participate in the survival girl group television show Produce 101. She finished fourth and debuted as part of I.O.I. After the disbandment of I.O.I, MNH planned for Chungha to debut as a soloist.

In 2019, teasers for MNH's new girl group, BVNDIT was released. It was the first girl group produced by MNH Entertainment. The group consists of 5 members and made their debut on 10 April 2019 with "Hocus Pocus". On 15 May 2019, BVNDIT released their song titled "Dramatic".

On January 28, 2020, MNH revealed their plans for a new music project New.wav, which aims for the agency artists to more frequently interact with the public through diverse music, apart from their regular album releases. MNH introduced their first actor, Yoon Jae-yong. He made his acting debut in the SBS drama Nobody Knows.

Artists

Recording artists

Groups
 8Turn

Soloists
 Lim Sang-hyun
 Vvon

Former artists
 Yoon Jae-yong (2020)
 Bvndit (2019–2022)
 Yiyeon (2019–2022)
 Songhee (2019–2022)
 Jungwoo (2019–2022)
 Simyeong (2019–2022)
 Seungeun (2019–2022)
 Chungha (2016–2023)

Discography

Projects
New.wav -  music project

Awards and nominations

References

External links
 

Companies based in Seoul
K-pop record labels
South Korean record labels
Talent agencies of South Korea
Entertainment companies established in 2014
Record labels established in 2014